The 2020–21 Tweede Divisie season was the fifth edition of the Dutch third tier since on hiatus from 1970-71 season and the 20th edition using Tweede Divisie name.

At an extraordinary KNVB federation meeting on 2 October 2017, representatives of the amateur and professional football reached an agreement about the route to be taken to renew the football pyramid. Part of this agreement was that no promotion or relegation took place between the Eerste and Tweede Divisie for the 2017–18 season at first.

At another extraordinary KNVB meeting on 7 June 2018, an agreement was reached about the number of reserves teams allowed in each division as of the 2019–20 season and the extension of the non-promotion or relegation clause to initially two more seasons. For the Tweede Divisie it has been two teams.

The KNVB met again on 16 December 2019 and decided to further extend the clause to last until 2022–23 and to relegate reserve teams from the Tweede Divisie along with the other second teams in the new under-21 competition.

Effects of the coronavirus pandemic 
In the previous season, on 31 March 2020, the KNVB decided to cancel all competitions at amateur level. They also decided, for those competitions involved, there would be no final standings, and therefore no champions, no promotions and no relegations.

As a result this season started with the exact same teams as the previous season.

On 3 December 2020, the KNVB announced that the regular competition would no longer be continued. Instead, the league would have been split into two groups of nine teams followed by playoffs. On 24 February 2021, the KNVB eventually discontinued ongoing category A senior competitions, from Tweede Divisie and below, again without promotion or relegation.

Teams

Standings

Regular competition

Fixtures/results

References 

Tweede Divisie seasons
Tweede Divisie
Netherlands
Netherlands